Leslie Antonia Malton (born 15 November 1958) is an American-German actress. She is the chairman of the Bundesverband Schauspiel (BFFS).

Life 
Malton is the daughter of a US diplomat father and an Austrian mother. She only lived in the United States for five years. She spent her school and youth days in Vienna. At the age of 14, she already wanted to be an actress.

Malton started her career at the theater. From 1985 she was a member of the Wiener Burgtheater, where she first appeared as Ophelia in William Shakespeare's Hamlet (title role Klaus Maria Brandauer; director Hans Hollmann). Later she was often seen in productions by George Tabori for radio plays.

Malton has played and starred in numerous German television films and series and also works as a spokeswoman for radio plays.

For her first international cinema production, she was engaged in 1984 by the Japanese director Masato Harada for the racing film Races. In this Japanese-German co-production, she played the main female role alongside Hiroyuki Watanabe, Claus Theo Gärtner, Deborah Sasson, Stuart Wolfe, Dean Reed and Patrick Stewart.

In 1990 she received a Golden Camera Prize for her three main roles in Perfume for a Suicide (La Mort a dit peut-être), The Copper Trap (Die Kupferfalle), and Dangerous Seduction (Plagio  Il piccolo popolo). She had her breakthrough for the German audience in 1992 with her role as Gudrun Lange in the ZDF - four-part series , for which she won the Bavarian TV Prize in 1993 and the Telestar was awarded. In this mini series by Dieter Wedel she played alongside Mario Adorf, Will Quadflieg, Renan Demirkan, Heinz Hoenig, Ingrid Steeger and Dominique Horwitz. Since then she has been one of the most sought-after TV actresses in Germany.

Leslie Malton has been married to actor Felix von Manteuffel since 1995 and lives in Berlin. In addition to American citizenship, she has German citizenship since 2019.

Social engagement 
In 2011, Malton volunteered to support Projekt Deutsche Winterreise by the author Stefan Weiller as spokeswoman. Since 2009, the project - in collaboration with institutions such as the Diakonisches Werk - has given city-specific attention to the situation of homeless people in a song and text cycle.

Since 2013, she has been an ambassador for children with Rett syndrome in Germany, from which her younger sister is also ill. In 2015 the book Letter to My Sister, which was written together with Roswitha Quadflieg, also appeared, in which she describes her sister's story and the relationship between them.

Selected filmography
  (1980), as Esther
 Possession (1981), as Sara
 The Magic Mountain (1982), as Hermine Kleefeld
  (1982, TV film), as Marianne
 Blood and Honor: Youth Under Hitler (1982, TV miniseries), as Renate Keller
 Races (1984), as Sam
 The Post Office Girl (1988, TV film), as Isabelle von Heim
 Stolen Minds (1990, TV film), as Alice
 Shadows of Love (1992), as Christin
  (1992, TV miniseries), as Gudrun Lange
 The Tourist (1996, TV film), as Karen Lanz
  (1996, TV film), as Barbara Rittberg
 Midnight Flight (1998, TV film), as Angela Sullivan
  (2006), as Magdalena's Mother
  (2009), as Dr. Helga Hallberg
  (2013), as Helene Schuster

References

External links

1958 births
Living people
Actresses from Washington, D.C.
American emigrants to Germany
German people of Austrian descent
German film actresses
German stage actresses
German television actresses
20th-century German actresses
21st-century German actresses